Alamuru is a village in Konaseema district in the state of Andhra Pradesh in India.

Geography
It has an average elevation of 1 meter (6 feet).

References 

Villages in Alamuru mandal